Linda Janell Carson ( Smith; May 3, 1947 – July 25, 2020) was an American sprinter. She competed in the women's 400 metres at the 1964 Summer Olympics. She died of cancer in 2020 at the age of 73.

References

External links
 

1947 births
2020 deaths
American female sprinters
Olympic track and field athletes of the United States
Athletes (track and field) at the 1964 Summer Olympics
Olympic female sprinters
Deaths from cancer in Kansas
21st-century American women